Ottó Foky (June 15, 1927 – September 3, 2012) was a Hungarian animator. He was born in Sárhida.

Films

Director 
Egy világhírű vadász emlékiratai (1968–70)
A kiscsacsi kalandjai (1971)
Mirr-Murr, a kandúr (1972–75)
Makk Marci mesél (1973)
Babfilm (Scenes with beans, 1975)
A legkisebb Ugrifüles (1975–76)
Makk Marci (1977-1978)
Varjúdombi mesék (1978–79)
Misi mókus kalandjai (1980–81)
Süsüke, a sárkánygyerek (2000)

Notes

External links

1927 births
2012 deaths
People from Sárhida
Hungarian animators
Hungarian animated film directors